Rodolfo Arrabale Valente (born 8 March 1993) is a Brazilian actor best known for playing Rafael in the Netflix series 3%.

Career
Valente began working as an actor at the age of nine months. He has appeared in advertisements, movies, television, and on theatre stages. He underwent professional training at Studio Beto Silveira and took courses in physical theatre, such as in Commedia dell'arte, clowning, and mime. He has acted in several plays, such as Excepcionalmente Normal, ABC do Amor, Para Onde Vai a Escuridão Quando a Gente Acende a Luz, Fragmentos de Equus, Caverna do Dragão, Pequenos Palhaços, and Carro de Paulista. He has appeared on television in programs such as Sítio do Picapau Amarelo, Ilha Rá-Tim-Bum, Eterna Magia, Revelação, Seus Olhos, and Essas Mulheres. He has been involved with the Carpintaria do Ator centre since 2008. In 2011, he joined the School of Dramatic Arts at the University of São Paulo.

In 2012, Rodolfo joined the cast of Malhação (Young Hearts) on the Rede Globo network, playing the character of Rafael, who is bullied as he hangs out with the girls in the class, with whom he has more affinity, not liking football and being interested in fashion.

In 2016, he made an appearance in the soap opera Carinha de Anjo, playing Ricardo, a romantic and passionate young man. In the same year, he was cast in 3%, the first Portuguese-language Netflix original series as well as the first produced in Brazil, as Rafael.

Filmography

Film

Television

References

External links
 

1993 births
Living people
Male actors from São Paulo
Brazilian male television actors
Brazilian male film actors
Brazilian male stage actors
University of São Paulo alumni
21st-century Brazilian male actors